The men's 100 metres at the 2022 European Athletics Championships took place at the Olympiastadion on 15 and 16 August.

Records

Schedule

Results

Round 1
First 3 in each heat (Q) and the next 1 fastest  (q) advance to the Semifinals. The 14 highest ranked athletes received a bye into the semi-finals

Wind:Heat 1: +0.7 m/s, Heat 2: 0.0 m/s, Heat 3: +0.1 m/s

Semifinals

The ten qualifiers from round 1 are joined by the fourteen highest ranked athletes who received a bye. 

First 2 in each semifinal (Q) and the next 2 fastest (q) advance to the Final.

Wind:
SF 1: 0.0 m/s, SF 2: +0.2 m/s, SF 3: +0.2 m/s

Final

References

100 M
100 metres at the European Athletics Championships